Night Skies is a 2007 American science fiction horror film directed by Roy Knyrim and starring Jason Connery, A.J. Cook, George Stults, and Ashley Peldon. It is set during the time of the so-called "Phoenix Lights", one of the largest UFO sightings ever.

Plot
A group of friends, including Matt, his fiancée Lily, his sister Molly, along with Joe and June, embark on a trip to Las Vegas, NV in an RV. After getting lost on a shortcut, they notice lights in the sky that appear to be following the RV. While entranced by them, they crash while swerving to miss a stranded motorist called Richard.

Joe is injured by a knife in the crash. Unfortunately, the knife is dangerously close to an artery, forcing them to leave it in. While searching for assistance, Molly becomes acquainted with Richard, who was a POW who was tortured by the Iraqis in the Gulf War. While working on repairing the RV, Matt hears noises in the woods.  He leaves to investigate them.

Joe's condition deteriorates, due to damage to his artery, forcing the group to search for additional assistance. They find a house with a working phone. The group realize Matt is not with them. When aliens surround them, Richard shoots at them, accidentally killing Matt in the process.

Richard returns to the RV and tells the others of the aliens, while not mentioning Matt's fate. Molly forces her way out of the RV to find Matt, but is sucked up by a green light. As Joe's breathing stops, June is pulled out of the RV. The RV shakes violently and the windows burst inward as the aliens attack, prompting the surviving Lily and Richard to escape into the forest, eventually ending up in an abandoned shack, where Richard barricades the door with a table. The aliens then locate the cabin, destroying the barriers and moving in on the hiding pair. Richard, knowing they have been found, fires on the aliens before being grabbed and subsequently abducted. Lily escapes as the aliens completely destroy the cabin. After running a short distance and accidentally becoming caught in barbed wire, she too is captured.

Richard regains consciousness inside an organic chamber. Exploring his surroundings and hearing a distant voice, he finds Lily being experimented on by the aliens, ultimately having her three-month-old foetus removed. When the aliens leave, Richard approaches her. Realising the aliens have taken her unborn child, Lily begs Richard to shoot her, to which Richard reluctantly complies. The returning aliens then restrain Richard and begin mercilessly experimenting on him.

Some time later, a police officer patrols a deserted area, where he finds Richard. A text epilogue states that Richard was found 100 miles from the site of his broken down truck and the group's RV. In semi-catatonic state, Richard was subsequently subject to rehabilitation which restored partial memories of the encounter. Despite his description of the night's events, no trace of either vehicle nor any of the other victims was ever found. The text concludes with the statement that the lights continue to appear over Phoenix Arizona to this day.

Cast 
 Jason Connery as Richard
 A. J. Cook as Lily
 George Stults as Matt
 Ashley Peldon as Molly
 Gwendoline Yeo as June
 Joseph Sikora as Joe
 Michael Dorn as Kyle

References

External links 
 
 

2007 horror films
2007 films
Alien abduction films
Films set in 1997
Films set in Arizona
Films about extraterrestrial life
Alien invasions in films
American science fiction horror films
2000s English-language films
2000s American films